Asthenotricha grandis is a moth in the family Geometridae first described by Claude Herbulot in 1997. It is found in Rwanda.

References

Moths described in 1997
Asthenotricha
Moths of Africa